United Nations Security Council resolution 1358, adopted by acclamation at a closed meeting on 27 June 2001, having considered the question of the recommendation for the appointment of the Secretary-General of the United Nations, the Council recommended to the General Assembly that Mr. Kofi Annan be appointed for a second term of office from 1 January 2002, to 31 December 2006.

Annan's election was uncontested as he had declared his intention to run for Secretary-General in March 2001 and nations had approved of his decision immediately. His appointment was subsequently endorsed by the General Assembly.

See also
 List of United Nations Security Council Resolutions 1301 to 1400 (2000–2002)
 United Nations Security Council Resolution 1987 (2011)
 United Nations Security Council Resolution 2580 (2021)

References

External links
 
Text of the Resolution at undocs.org

 1358
 1358
June 2001 events